As I Am is the twenty-second studio album by Canadian country pop artist Anne Murray. It was released by Capitol Records in 1988. The album peaked at number 29 on the Billboard Top Country Albums chart.

The album received a mixed review in People, which said that "This album, thank goodness, has no hint of the Disco Annie mode that has crept into some later Murray albums" but added that it was "listless".

Track listing

Personnel 
 Anne Murray – lead vocals, backing vocals (1, 3, 5-10)
 Shane Keister – keyboards (1, 2, 4, 6, 8, 10), sequencing (6)
 Mike Lawler – keyboards (1, 2)
 Doug Riley – acoustic piano (2, 4, 5, 8, 9), keyboards (7)
 David Humphreys – Fairlight programming (2, 3, 5, 6, 9)
 Robbie Buchanan – synthesizers (3), arrangements (3)
 Dennis Burnside – keyboards (5, 7, 8)
 Steve Sexton – keyboards (5, 7, 9)
 Mark Casstevens – acoustic guitar (1, 2, 4, 6, 8, 10)
 Steve Gibson – electric guitar (1-6, 8, 10), acoustic guitar (2, 10)
 Greg Jennings – electric guitar solo (1, 6), guitar solo (2)
 Larry Byrom – acoustic guitar (2, 4, 8)
 Bob Mann – electric guitar (5, 9), acoustic guitar (7)
 Mike Francis – electric guitar (5, 7), acoustic guitar (9)
 Doyle Grisham – steel guitar (10)
 Mike Brignardello – bass (1, 2, 4, 6, 8, 10)
 David Hungate – bass (3)
 Tom Szczesniak – bass (5, 7, 9)
 Paul Leim – drums (1, 2, 4, 6, 8, 10)
 Barry Keane – drums (5, 7, 9)
 Terry McMillan – percussion (1, 3, 8, 10)
 Jim Horn – saxophone (3, 5, 7, 9)
 Rick Wilkins – string arrangements and conductor 
 Bruce Murray – backing vocals (1, 5, 6, 7)
 Debbie Schaal – backing vocals (1, 3, 5-10)
 Kathie Baillie – backing vocals (2)
 Michael Bonagura – backing vocals (2)
 Alan LeBoeuf – backing vocals (2)
 Shirley Eikhard – backing vocals (3, 9)
 Denny Henson – backing vocals (5)
 Walter Igelheart – backing vocals (5)
 Dennis Locorriere – backing vocals (5)

Production 
 Balmur Limited – executive producer 
 Kyle Lehning – producer, mixing, additional overdubs, engineer (3) 
 Joe Bogan – engineer (1, 2, 4, 6, 8, 10)
 Ken Friesen – engineer (5, 7, 9), vocal engineer, string engineer 
 Scott Campbell – string engineer
 Kirt Odle – assistant engineer (1, 2, 4, 6, 8, 10), additional overdubs
 Gary Paczosa – assistant engineer (1, 2, 4, 6, 8, 10)
 Joe Mancuso – assistant engineer (5, 7, 9), assistant vocal engineer 
 John Condon – additional overdub assistant 
 John Frickle – mix assistant 
 Keith Odle – mix assistant 
 Doug Sax – mastering 
 Paul Cade – art direction, design 
 Nigel Dickson – photography 
 Leonard T. Rambeau – management

Studios
 Recorded at Nightingale Studio (Nashville, Tennessee); The Hop (Los Angeles, California); Eastern Sound and Manta Sound (Toronto, Ontario, Canada).
 Overdubbed at Morningstar Sound Studio (Hendersonville, Tennessee), Eastern Sound and Manta Sound (Toronto, Ontario, Canada)
 Mixed at GroundStar Studios (Nashville, Tennessee).
 Mastered at The Mastering Lab (Hollywood, California).

Charts

Weekly charts

Year-end charts

References

1988 albums
Anne Murray albums
Capitol Records albums
Albums produced by Kyle Lehning